SM42 is the PKP class for a Polish shunter diesel locomotive for shunting and light freight traffic, built by Fablok in Chrzanów (manufacturer's designation is Ls800E, designer's designation 6D).

History
The SM42 was the first Polish-designed heavier diesel-electric locomotive and was the most numerous one in its country of origin.

Introduction
The technical documentation for this locomotive was developed in 1958-1962 by the state Central Construction Bureau of Railway Stock Industry (CBKPTK) in Poznań, as type 6D. The production was given over to the Fablok Locomotive Factory in Chrzanów, where it was designated Ls800E (meaning an 800 HP diesel locomotive with electric transmission). The prototype was ready in December 1963. It was lent to the Polish State Railways (PKP), as the SM42-001, the class designation 'SM' meaning a diesel shunter locomotive, and was tested in Warsaw in 1964. Two improved locomotives were built for the PKP in 1964, and twenty in 1965. In 1967, the locomotive entered serial production and 1,822 were built until production ceased in 1992. During the long production run, some minor improvements were incorporated into the design. The locomotives produced from 1972 onwards (so-called batch 2) had simplified chassis (starting from SM42-521, works no. 8499).

The main buyer of Ls800 locomotives, which had priority in orders, were the Polish State Railways, which received 1157 locomotives. They were used for shunting, local freight traffic and local passenger traffic in warm months. 622 were made for the Polish industry, some in Ls800P variant with single steering only (they were designated by their users as Ls800 or SM42, with numbers above 2000).

A variant of type 6D/SM42 locomotive was a type 101D locomotive, equipped with a steam generator for carriage heating. 268 locomotives of this variant were built and classified as SP42.

Later modifications
In 1972, a new version (6DM) was developed specifically for Moroccan railways (ONCFM). 37 were delivered as class DG 200 in 1973-1975. The main difference with respect to the original design was better anti-dust insulation of the machine compartment. Six similar locomotives, type 6DI, were built in 1982 for Dromex, a Polish building company operating in Iraq.

In the years 1975-1977, 40 locomotives were converted to SU42 ("diesel universal") class, with the addition of 500 V electric train supply for heating of passenger carriages. Due to the withdrawal of such carriages, in 2000 the electric supply systems were removed and these locomotives were reclassified back to SM42. In the years 1999-2000, 40 SP42 locomotives were equipped with standard 3 kV electric train supply and classified as SU42 too.

In the 2000s, a number of companies started offering comprehensive modernisations of the locomotive, involving the replacement of the prime mover, generator and air compressors, upgraded driver's cab (that better isolates against the engine vibrations the original locomotive was famous for) and various changes to the body. Some of the companies that offer the rebuilds are:
 Newag – 6Dg, 18D, 6Dl (with 3 kV electric train heating; equivalent to SU42 functionality)
 Pesa – 6Dk
  – 6Dh-1

Nicknames
This locomotive has also been referred to by the following nicknames:
Zebra or Stonka (Colorado beetle) – from the original livery
Wibrator (Vibrator) – from the vibrations the engine produced
Eleska – from the factory designation: Ls800
Fablok – from the producer

See also
Polish locomotives designation

References

External links

SP42 at the Chabówka Rail Museum
SM42, SP42 and SU42 – article with photos and technical data
SM42 picture gallery

Bo′Bo′ locomotives
Diesel-electric locomotives of Poland
Fablok locomotives
Railway locomotives introduced in 1967
Standard gauge locomotives of Poland